C6orf136 (Chromosome 6 Open Reading Frame 136) is a protein in humans (Homo sapiens) encoded by the C6orf136 gene. The gene is conserved in mammals, mollusks, as well some porifera.  While the function of the gene is currently unknown, C6orf136 has been shown to be hypermethylated in response to FOXM1 expression in Head Neck Squamous Cell Carcinoma (HNSCC) tissue cells. Additionally, elevated expression of C6orf136 has been associated with improved survival rates in patients with bladder cancer. C6orf136 has three known isoforms.

Gene

Background 
C6orf136, also known as DADB-129D20.1, MGC15854, LOC221545, and OTTHUMP00000214979. The gene is a poorly characterized protein coding gene in need of further research. The C6orf136 gene can be accessed on NCBI with accession number NM_001109938.3.

Location 
C6orf136 is located on the short arm of chromosome 6 (6p21.33), starting at base pair (bp) 30,647,133 and ending at bp 30,653,207. This gene spans 6,074 bps on the plus (+) strand and contains a total of 6 exons.

Gene Neighborhood 
Genes in the neighborhood of C6orf136 are the following: ATAT1, PPP1R10, DHX16, PPP1R18, MDC1, MRPS18B, TUBB, and FLOT1.

mRNA 
C6orf136 has a total of 3 different isoforms. Isoform 1 is the base version of C6orf136 that encodes for the 315 amino acid protein. Isoform 3 uses an alternate in-frame splice site in the 5' coding region when compared to isoform 1, resulting in isoform 3 being longer than isoform 1. Alternatively, isoform 2 lacks an alternate in-frame exon in the 5' coding region when compared to isoform 1, resulting an isoform 2 being shorter than isoform 1

Protein

General Properties 

The sequence for the C6orf136 isoform 1 gene per NCBI is as follows:
 MYQPSRGAARRLGPCLRAYQARPQDQLYPGTLPFPPLWPHSTTTTSPSSPLFWSPLPPRLPTQRLPQVPP  70
 LPLPQIQALSSAWVVLPPGKGEEGPGPELHSGCLDGLRSLFEGPPCPYPGAWIPFQVPGTAHPSPATPSG 140
 DPSMEEHLSVMYERLRQELPKLFLQSHDYSLYSLDVEFINEILNIRTKGRTWYILSLTLCRFLAWNYFAH 210
 LRLEVLQLTRHPENWTLQARWRLVGLPVHLLFLRFYKRDKDEHYRTYDAYSTFYLNSSGLICRHRLDKLM 280
 PSHSPPTPVKKLLVGALVALGLSEPEPDLNLCSKP                                    315
The bolded region in this sequence indicates a domain of unknown function (DUF2358) found in all three isoforms of C6orf136. 

The C6orf136 protein has a molecular weight of 35.8 kD and an isoelectric point of 8.99, making the protein slightly basic and physiological pH.

Domains 
DUF2358 is a domain of unknown function found within the C6orf136 protein from aa149 to aa274. This domain is highly conserved in the C-terminus region and is evolutionarily conserved from plants to humans. Additionally, a proline rich domain was also predicted from aa29 to aa142 of the human C6orf136 protein.

Structure

Secondary Structure 
The conserved DUF2358 domain of C6orf136 contains an equal mix of alpha helices and beta sheets interspersed in that region. The N-terminus of the protein contained primarily alpha helices, but was poorly conserved across species.

Tertiary Structure 
The tertiary structure illustrates a primarily alpha helices in the N-terminus of the protein loosely wound up, followed by a densely packed and folded region correlating to the DUF2358 domain with a mix of alpha helices and beta sheets as determined by I-TASSER.

Regulation

Gene Regulation

Promotor 
C6orf136 has 5 predicted promotor regions. The GXP_6051617 promotor had the largest number of transcripts and CAGE tags. It's located on the plus (+) strand, starts at position 30646644, ends at position 30647460, and is 817 bp in length. It also has 12 total coding transcripts.

Transcription Factor Binding Sites 
The following table highlights the most likely transcription factors binding to the GXP_6051617 promotor for C6orf136.

Expression Pattern 
C6orf136 is expressed highly in the heart, intestine, brain, and kidney tissue. According to AceView, it is well expressed at 1.3x the average gene expression.

Transcription Regulation

Stem Loop Prediction 
The 3’ UTR sequence had a total of 7 step loops with a single site for potential miRNA binding. In contrast, the 5’ UTR had only 2 stem loops and contained no other notable regions.

miRNA Targeting 
TargetScan indicated a single hsa-miRNA-585-3p miRNA binding site in the 3' UTR, shown to be associated with tumor-suppressing properties with respect to gastric cancer.

Protein Regulation

Subcellular Localization 
C6orf136 is predicted to be localized primarily in the nucleus in Homo sapiens, but is predicted to be primarily expressed in the mitochondria in other species.

Post-Translational Modification 
The C6orf136 gene has 8 predicted kinase-specific phosphorylation sites at positions 5, 28, 137, 139, 191, 256, 261, and 303, where 4 of the phosphorylation sites are serines, 3 sites are threonines, and 1 is a tryptophan. Additionally, the protein also has a single predicted SUMOylation site at position 247 on a lysine with a p-value of 0.063.

Homology

Paralogs 

No paralogs of C6orf136 have been detected in the human genome.

Orthologs 
Below is a table of selected orthologs of the C6orf136 gene, including closely and distantly related orthologs.  C6orf136 has evolved moderately and evenly over time with a rate faster than Cytochrome C but slower than Fibrinogen Alpha.

Function

References 

Genes on human chromosome 7